The 1998–99 QMJHL season was the 30th season in the history of the Quebec Major Junior Hockey League (QMJHL). The league continued its trend of teams relocating into the Atlantic Canada market, when Laval moved to Bathurst, New Brunswick. Fifteen teams played seventy games each in the schedule. The Quebec Remparts repeated as first overall in the regular season winning their second consecutive Jean Rougeau Trophy. The Acadie-Bathurst Titan won the President's Cup, defeating the Hull Olympiques in the finals.

Team changes
 Laval Titan Collège Français relocated to Bathurst, New Brunswick, becoming the Acadie-Bathurst Titan, and switched to the Dilio Division.
 The Sherbrooke Faucons are renamed the Sherbrooke Castors, reviving a historic franchise name.

Final standings
Note: GP = Games played; W = Wins; L = Losses; T = Ties; PTS = Points; GF = Goals for; GA = Goals against

complete list of standings.

Scoring leaders
Note: GP = Games played; G = Goals; A = Assists; Pts = Points; PIM = Penalty minutes

 complete scoring statistics

Playoffs
Mathieu Benoît was the leading scorer of the playoffs with 41 points (20 goals, 21 assists).

All-star teams
First team
 Goaltender – Mathieu Chouinard, Shawinigan Cataractes
 Left defence – Jiri Fischer, Hull Olympiques
 Right defence – Jonathan Girard, Acadie-Bathurst Titan
 Left winger – Jérôme Tremblay, Rouyn-Noranda Huskies
 Centreman – Mike Ribeiro, Rouyn-Noranda Huskies
 Right winger – James Desmarais, Rouyn-Noranda Huskies
 Coach – Guy Chouinard, Quebec Remparts

Second team
 Goaltender – Maxime Ouellet, Quebec Remparts
 Left defence – Simon Tremblay, Quebec Remparts
 Right defence – Dmitri Tolkunov, Quebec Remparts
 Left winger – David Thibeault, Victoriaville Tigres
 Centreman – Simon Gagné, Quebec Remparts
 Right winger – Mathieu Benoît, Chicoutimi Saguenéens / Acadie-Bathurst Titan
 Coach – Denis Francoeur, Shawinigan Cataractes

Rookie team
 Goaltender – Alexei Volkov, Halifax Mooseheads
 Left defence – Andrew Carver, Hull Olympiques
 Right defence – Dimitri Kalinin, Moncton Wildcats
 Left winger – Juraj Kolnik, Quebec Remparts / Rimouski Océanic
 Centreman – Ladislav Nagy, Halifax Mooseheads
 Right winger – Guillaume Lamoureux, Val-d'Or Foreurs
 Coach – Bruce Campbell, Cape Breton Screaming Eagles
 List of First/Second/Rookie team all-stars.

Trophies and awards
Team
President's Cup – Playoff Champions, Acadie-Bathurst Titan
Jean Rougeau Trophy – Regular Season Champions, Quebec Remparts
Robert Lebel Trophy – Team with best GAA, Halifax Mooseheads

Player
Michel Brière Memorial Trophy – Most Valuable Player, Mathieu Chouinard, Shawinigan Cataractes
Jean Béliveau Trophy – Top Scorer, Mike Ribeiro, Rouyn-Noranda Huskies
Guy Lafleur Trophy – Playoff MVP, Mathieu Benoît, Acadie-Bathurst Titan
Telus Cup – Offensive – Offensive Player of the Year, James Desmarais, Rouyn-Noranda Huskies
Telus Cup – Defensive – Defensive Player of the Year, Mathieu Chouinard, Shawinigan Cataractes
AutoPro Plaque – Best plus/minus total, Simon Tremblay, Quebec Remparts
Philips Plaque – Best faceoff percentage, Éric Demers, Moncton Wildcats
Jacques Plante Memorial Trophy – Best GAA, Maxime Ouellet, Quebec Remparts
Emile Bouchard Trophy – Defenceman of the Year, Jiri Fischer, Hull Olympiques
Mike Bossy Trophy – Best Pro Prospect, Maxime Ouellet, Quebec Remparts
RDS Cup – Rookie of the Year, Ladislav Nagy, Halifax Mooseheads
Michel Bergeron Trophy – Offensive Rookie of the Year, Ladislav Nagy, Halifax Mooseheads
Raymond Lagacé Trophy – Defensive Rookie of the Year, Alexei Volkov, Halifax Mooseheads
Frank J. Selke Memorial Trophy – Most sportsmanlike player, Eric Chouinard, Quebec Remparts
QMJHL Humanitarian of the Year – Humanitarian of the Year, Philippe Sauvé, Rimouski Océanic
Marcel Robert Trophy – Best Scholastic Player, Christian Robichaud, Victoriaville Tigres
Paul Dumont Trophy – Personality of the Year, Simon Gagné, Quebec Remparts

Executive
Ron Lapointe Trophy – Coach of the Year, Guy Chouinard, Quebec Remparts
John Horman Trophy – Executive of the Year, Charles Henry, Hull Olympiques
St-Clair Group Plaque – Marketing Director of the Year, Matt McKnight, Halifax Mooseheads

See also
1999 Memorial Cup
1999 NHL Entry Draft
1998–99 OHL season
1998–99 WHL season

References
 Official QMJHL Website
 www.hockeydb.com/

Quebec Major Junior Hockey League seasons
QMJHL